The Making Ontario Open for Business Act (Bill 47, 2018) is a law in the province of Ontario that froze the minimum wage in the province and removing a number of protections of workers' rights.

Summary   
The bill contained three schedules: Schedule 1 making a number of changes to the Employment Standards Act, 2000, Schedule 2 to the Labour Relations Act, 1995, and Schedule 3 to the Ontario College of Trades and Apprenticeship  Act, 2009. The bill additionally repealed many of the provisions of the Fair Workplaces, Better Jobs Act, 2017.

Among the changes brought by Schedule 1 were:
 Freezing the minimum wage in Ontario at $14,00, thus eliminating the planned increased in 2019
 Indexing the minimum wage to inflation, beginning in October 2020
 Eliminating personal emergency leave and replacing it with separate leave provisions for unpaid sick leave, family responsibility leave, and bereavement leave
 Decreasing the penalties for contraventions of the Employment Standards Act 
 Eliminating the requirement of equal pay for equal work
 Eliminating the reverse onus requiring the employer to prove that an individual is not an employee in disputes over whether the individual is an employee or not 

Among the changes brought by Schedule 2 were:
 Eliminating the ability of trade unions to obtain a list of employees 
 Eliminating the ability of parties to request educational support in the practice of labour relations and collective bargaining
 Eliminating the right of employees to have their rate of pay reviewed by employers
 Replacing collective agreement mediation with arbitration as the first resort during collective bargaining disputes 
 Decreasing the penalties for contraventions of the Labour Relations Act

Legislative history  
The bill was introduced to the Legislative Assembly of Ontario by Progressive Conservative MPP for Bay of Quinte and Ministry of Economic Development, Job Creation and Trade Todd Smith in late October 2018.

From 12 November to 20 November 2018, the bill was reviewed by the Standing Committee on Finance and Economic Affairs.

On 21 November 2018, the final vote on the bill was held, with 69 MPPs voting in favour and 45 voting against. It received royal assent from Lieutenant-Governor Elizabeth Dowdeswell that same day.

Reactions 
The Ontario Chamber of Commerce supported the bill, stating that it was "a bold step in creating a stronger and more prosperous province." Premier Doug Ford defended the bill, stating that the Fair Workplaces, Better Jobs Act, 2017 "was the worst job-killing bill. It was the worst bill for people, the most vulnerable people in society to get a hand up."

The bill was opposed by several trade unions in the province. The Elementary Teachers' Federation of Ontario stated that "Ontario's economy is not going to grow when 40 per cent of working people do not have disposable income to fuel the economy nor the stability to feed their families," while the Ontario Federation of Labour stated Ford "has proven he's an enemy of workers." On 26 October 2018, a protest was organised by unions against the bill outside the Ministry of Labour. A further protest was held in late-November, resulting in several protestors being handcuffed and escorted out of the Queen’s Park gallery.

Concerns were also raised by public health groups concerning the impact the elimination of paid sick days would have. Minister of Health Christine Elliott stated that her ministry had not been consulted about the bill. Those concerns were raised again during the COVID-19 pandemic in Ontario in 2020.

A Campaign Research opinion poll released on 13 November 2018 found that 77% of those polled opposed the elimination of paid sick days and that 52% opposed the freezing of the minimum wage.

References

External links 
 Text of the Act in English

Ontario provincial legislation
2018 in Canadian law
2018 in Ontario
Labour law
Labour relations in Ontario
Minimum wage law
Employment in Canada